Simon Bradstreet (1603–1697) was a 17th-century colonial governor of Massachusetts.

Simon Bradstreet may also refer to:

Sir Simon Bradstreet, 1st Baronet (1693–1762) of the Bradstreet baronets
Sir Simon Bradstreet, 2nd Baronet (1728–1773) of the Bradstreet baronets
Sir Simon Bradstreet, 4th Baronet (1772–1853) of the Bradstreet baronets

See also
Simon Bradstreet Robie (1770–1858), lawyer, judge and political figure in Nova Scotia
Bradstreet, surname